Ship earth station (also: ship earth radio station) is – according to Article 1.78 of the International Telecommunication Union's (ITU) ITU Radio Regulations (RR) – defined as «A mobile earth station in the maritime mobile-satellite service located on board ship.»

The ITU regulation requires that each radio station be classified according to the service in which it operates permanently or temporarily.

Ship earth stations can provide a variety of radiocommunication services including crew calling.

Classification
In accordance with ITU Radio Regulations (article 1) this type of radio station might be classified as follows: 
Earth station (article 1.63)
Mobile earth station (article 1.68) of the mobile-satellite service (article 1.25)
Land earth station (article 1.70) of the fixed-satellite service (article 1.21) or mobile-satellite service
Land mobile earth station (article 1.74) of the land mobile-satellite service (article 1.27)
Base earth station (article 1.72) of the fixed-satellite service
Coast earth station (article 1.76) of the fixed-satellite service / mobile-satellite service
Ship earth station
Aeronautical earth station (article 1.82) of the fixed-satellite service / aeronautical mobile-satellite service (article 1.35)
Aircraft earth station (article 1.84) of the aeronautical mobile-satellite service

References / sources 

 International Telecommunication Union (ITU)

Radio stations and systems ITU
Maritime communication